The portable system for telemetry applications is a solution that gathers in a portable computer full functionalities and performances. Based on Data acquisition software, Portable Telemetry is an essential tool for the test engineer to run tests on-site.

Function
Portable Telemetry system acquires, analyzes and visualizes data from PCM telemetry signal, whatever the format (IRIG, CCSDS, CE83). Portable Telemetry is defined in various configuration : laptop with PCMCIA cards, with PCI cards, or external USB modules. It provides all the functionality in the same working environment.

Use
Portable Telemetry can be used in various applications such as:
 Missile applications
 J.A.V Applications
 Aircraft / Flight testing
 Space

References

Telemetry